Stockholmsnatt (English: Stockholm Night or The King of Kungsan) is a Swedish drama film which was released to cinemas in Sweden on 23 January 1987,  directed by Staffan Hildebrand.

Plot
The film is loosely based on a true story about Paolo Roberto, later a professional boxer and TV presenter. Because of his Italian roots, Paolo is dealing with an identity crisis. With an admiration of kung fu films and with his teenage aggressions, the kung fu films have a negative impact on him, which tempts him to practice violence on innocent citizens in Stockholm.

The films takes place in Kungsträdgården, which normally is a popular meeting place, but is shown differently in the film because it has been occupied by violent teenage gangs. The film was shown amongst students during the late 1980s in order to prevent future violence between rival gangs. However, the film had an opposite effect on the youth who identified with Roberto, and became influential on the violent "kickers" subculture. It is today regarded as one of the most important cult films in Sweden.

Cast
 Paolo Roberto as Paolo
 Enzo Roberto as Paolo's father
 Ellen Roberto as Paolo's mother
 Ian Roberto as Ian
 Quincy Jones III as Quincy
 Camilla Lundén as Nillan
 Jonas Rasmusson as Ziggy
 Niklas Dahlqvist as Dizzy
 Liam Norberg as Mange (Credited as Magnus Ellertsson)

Home video
The film was released to VHS in 1987 and to DVD on 7 September 2005.

References

External links

Swedish drama films
1980s Swedish-language films
1987 films
1987 in Sweden
1980s Swedish films